The city of Ottawa, Canada held municipal elections on December 5, 1960.

Former mayor Charlotte Whitton returns to the mayoral chair, defeating controller and owner of the Ottawa Rough Riders, Sam Berger.

Mayor of Ottawa

Referendums

Ottawa Board of Control
(4 elected)

City council

(2 elected from each ward)

References
Ottawa Journal, December 6, 1960

Municipal elections in Ottawa
1960 elections in Canada
1960s in Ottawa
1960 in Ontario
December 1960 events in North America